Tomás Nahuel Luján (born 28 January 2000) is an Argentine footballer currently playing as a forward for Platense.

Career
Luján is a product of Platense. In March 2020, Luján was loaned out to Brazilian club Internacional for the rest of the year with an option for the club to buy 50% of his rights for a fee around $ 400,000. Luján was initially playing for the clubs reserve team.

In September 2020, during his loan spell at Internacional, Luján suffered an anterior cruciate ligament injury, after he collided with a teammate in the middle of training session. However, the loan deal was extended for six months further in January 2021, while he was still recovering.

Luján returned to Platense again in July 2021. Already a month later, Luján unfortunately suffered the same anterior cruciate ligament injury during a reserve league game for Platense.

Career statistics

Club

Notes

References

2000 births
Living people
Argentine footballers
Argentine expatriate footballers
Association football forwards
Primera Nacional players
Club Atlético Platense footballers
Sport Club Internacional players
Argentine expatriate sportspeople in Brazil
Expatriate footballers in Brazil
Sportspeople from Buenos Aires Province